Saugus Speedway is a 1/3 mile racetrack in Saugus, Santa Clarita, California on a  site. The track hosted one NASCAR Craftsman Truck Series event in 1995, which was won by Ken Schrader. Schrader became the first NASCAR driver to win in a race in all three of the sanctioning body's major series, following previous wins in the Winston Cup and Busch Grand National Series. The stadium was closed on July 19, 1995 and no longer holds races.

History
The track started out as a rodeo arena called Baker Ranch Stadium in 1927. Its construction was announced in December 1926. It was owned by Roy Baker, brother of shoe businessman C. H. Baker. The stadium held 18,000 spectators. During the Great Depression, it was sold in 1930 to Cowboy actor Hoot Gibson. He used the stadium for movie sets. The stadium was sold to Paul Hill in 1934. The valley that the stadium was in got flooded in 1937. Debris from the flood was too much for Hill to deal with, so the bank got the property.

William Bonelli purchased it and renamed Bonelli Stadium. In 1939, Bonelli started hosting open wheel racing on the flat dirt surface. Crowds of 10,000 to 12,000 watched drivers such as Walt Faulkner, Mel Hansen, Allen Heath, Johnny McDowell, Jack McGrath, Danny Oakes, Troy Ruttman, and Bill Vukovich. The track was part of the United Racing Association in 1940 and 1941. The last race during World War II was held on June 30, 1942. The track was unused in 1943 and 1944, like all racetracks in the United States. The track was the first circuit on the West Coast of the United States to host a post-war race when it reopened on September 9, 1945. Bill Vukovich won the race. Nine races were held that season, and Vukovich was crowned the champion.

The track was paved in 1946, but the pavement was removed and the track returned to dirt. Midget car racing was the national sensation in 1946, drawing large crowds to the track. Roadsters were the main class raced at the track from 1947 until 1950, until midget cars came back. The grandstands in the backstretch needed repairs, so the grandstands from Gilmore Stadium were installed after the track closed in 1950. From 1951 to 1955, the roadsters and midget cars shared the track equally, with occasional rodeos and circuses. The track was paved for a second time in 1956. The first stock car racing event on the track happened in 1957. It was promoted by Tony Coldeway, who later formed the Pacific Racing Association. 23 cars and 523 spectators came to the event. The track became mainly used for stock car events after that event. It featured USAC stock cars, NASCAR Winston West Series, and the NASCAR Southwest Tour. It also hosted the third race in NASCAR Craftsman Truck Series history during the series' first year on April 15, 1995. Ken Schrader beat Geoffrey Bodine by 1.7 seconds. The race had the slowest speed in Craftsman Truck Series history with an average speed of 43.526 miles per hour (70.048 kilometers per hour). 

In June 1994, the speedway hosted the graduating class of nearby William S. Hart High School after the stadium at College of the Canyons was deemed unsafe for occupancy; a consequence of the Northridge Earthquake. The track closed unexpectedly on July 19, 1995 in the middle of the season after the grandstands had been red-tagged and condemned by the County of Los Angeles, and have since been torn down.

Current use
The track hosts weekly swapmeets on Sundays, and flea markets on Saturday and Tuesday. The (Saugus) Santa Clarita Swap Meet features over 600 vendors and 15,000 people each Sunday since 1963. The track hosts numerous special events and festivals, including car shows, antique appraisals, and concerts. The track has been used for numerous films and television productions.

Notable drivers
Sonny Easley
Eddie Gray
Lance Hooper
Ron Hornaday Jr.
Ron Hornaday Sr.
Jimmy Insolo
Nick Joanides (final track record holder in the Super Late Model Division)
Sean Woodside, 1994 and 1995 track champ, NASCAR Southwest Tour
Rick Crow (final track record holder in the Street Stock Division Oval & Figure 8)

References

External links
Official website

Bill Converse Saugus Chevelle
The Saugus Speedway on Modern Day Ruins

Defunct motorsport venues in the United States
Motorsport venues in California
NASCAR tracks
Santa Clarita, California
Sports venues in Greater Los Angeles